feedtime is the eponymously titled debut studio album of noise rock band feedtime, released independently in 1985.

Track listing

Personnel 
Adapted from the feedtime liner notes.

feedtime
 Rick Johnson – vocals, guitar
 Al Larkin – bass guitar, vocals
 Tom Sturm – drums

Additional musicians and production
 Cameron Carter – illustrations
 Yvonne Duke – photography
 feedtime – mastering, mixing, recording, design
 Rhino – additional vocals (A3, B6)
 Jonathan Summers – mastering, mixing, engineering, recording

Release history

References

External links 
 

1985 debut albums
Feedtime albums